The Caribbean Terrane (TC) is one of the geological provinces (terranes) of Colombia. The terrane, dating to the Late Cretaceous, is situated on the North Andes Plate and borders the La Guajira, Chibcha and underlying Tahamí Terrane along the regional Bucaramanga-Santa Marta Fault. The terrane overlies the Tahamí, Arquía and Quebradagrande Terranes along the Romeral Fault System.

Reinterpretation 
A study performed by Mora Bohórquez et al. in 2017 showed no basement variation between the Chibcha Terrane San Lucas basement underlying the Lower Magdalena Valley (VIM) and the SNSM basement to the east of the Santa Marta Fault. The authors redefined the contacts between the different terranes, using the names Calima Terrane for the coastal portion of the Caribbean Terrane (San Jacinto and Sinú foldbelts) and Tahamí-Panzenú Terrane for the Tahamí Terrane.

Subdivision

Domains 
The terrane was subdivided by Fuck et al. (2008) into:

Oceanic crust
 Calima Terrane (Calima, emplaced in Late Cretaceous)
 Cuna Terrane (Cuna, emplaced in Miocene)
 Gorgona Terrane (Gorgona, Miocene)

Complexes 
 Alto Condoto
 Santa Cecilia-La Equis
 Uré
 Cajamarca
 Puquí
 Bolo Azul
 Cañasgordas
 Mistrató
 Mistrató Tonalite - Paleogene (46 ± 7 Ma)
 Buriticá
 Anserma - Late Cretaceous (71 ± 2.1 Ma)

Batholiths
 Acandí
 Mandé - Miocene
 Sabanalarga - Cretaceous
 Santa Bárbara
 Puqui
 Río Tarazá
 Carauta
 Nudillales
 Cerro Plateado
 Farallones
 Comitá
 San José de Urama
 La Clara-Río Calle

Volcanoes 

 Azufral
 Chiles
 Cumbal
 El Totumo (mud volcano)

Ranges 
 Central
 Western
 Nudo de los Pastos
 Darién
 Baudó
 Montes de María

Basins 

 Cauca-Patía
 Chocó
 Sinú-San Jacinto
 Tumaco
 Urabá

Faults 
 Bucaramanga-Santa Marta (BSF)
 Romeral (RFS)
 Armenia
 Buesaco-Aranda
 Córdoba-Navarco
 Montenegro
 Paraíso
 Piendamó
 Rosas-Julumito
 Abriaquí
 Argelia
 Cañasgordas
 Cauca
 Garrapatas
 Murindó
 Murrí
 Mutatá
 Montería
 Naya-Micay
 Piedrancha
 Remolino-El Charco
 Santa Rita
 El Tambor
 Toro
 Tucurá
 Unguía
 Urrao

Gallery

See also 

 List of earthquakes in Colombia
 List of fossiliferous stratigraphic units in Colombia
 List of mining areas in Colombia
 Geology of the Eastern Hills of Bogotá
 Cesar-Ranchería Basin
 Cocinetas Basin
 Middle Magdalena Valley (VMM)

References

Bibliography

Terranes

Caribbean Terrane

Reports

Maps 
 
 
 
 
 
 
 
 

Terranes
Geology of Colombia
Cretaceous Colombia
Late Cretaceous South America
Terranes
Terranes
Terranes
Terranes
Terranes
Terranes
Terranes
Terranes
Terranes
Terranes
Terranes
Terranes
Geology of the Andes